The Keio Hai Spring Cup (Japanese 京王杯スプリングカップ) is a Grade 2 horse race for Thoroughbreds aged four and run in May over a distance of 1,400 metres at Tokyo Racecourse.

It was first run in 1956 over 1600 metres and was later run over 1800 metres before being run over its current distance for the first time in 1981. The race was elevated to Grade 2 class in 1984.

Winners since 2000

Earlier winners

 1984 - Happy Princess
 1985 - Nihon Pillow Winner
 1986 - Toa Falcon
 1987 - Nippo Teio
 1988 - Dyna Actress
 1989 - Lindo Hoshi
 1990 - Shin Wind
 1991 - Daiichi Ruby
 1992 - Dynamite Daddy
 1993 - Yamanin Zephyr
 1994 - Ski Paradise
 1995 - Dumaani
 1996 - Heart Lake
 1997 - Taiki Blizzard
 1998 - Taiki Shuttle
 1999 - Grass Wonder

See also
 Horse racing in Japan
 List of Japanese flat horse races

References

Turf races in Japan